Braḱani is an abandoned village located in the municipality of Makedonski Brod, North Macedonia.

Demographics
In statistics gathered by Vasil Kanchov in 1900, the village of Braḱani was inhabited by 50 Muslim Albanians.

References

Villages in Makedonski Brod Municipality
Albanian communities in North Macedonia